WWEO-LP (103.9 FM) is a radio station broadcasting a religious radio format. Licensed to DeFuniak Springs, Florida, United States, the station serves the Ft. Walton Beach, Florida, area.  The station is currently owned by Emanuel Communications.

References

External links
 

WEO-LP
WEO-LP
Walton County, Florida